Tomi Odunsi Fadina (born 24 May 1987) is a Nigerian television actress, singer, and songwriter best known for playing "Salewa" in the television series, Tinsel, a popular African soap opera.

Tomi married Seun Fadina in 2016. The couple's first child was born in 2020.

Early life 
Tomi Odunsi was born on 24 May 1987 in Ogun State, Nigeria. Tomi Odunsi attended the University of Lagos, where she obtained a Bachelor of Arts (B.A) degree in Linguistics and African Languages with a specialization in the Yoruba language. Odunsi premiered her debut single, "I Wan Blow", in April 2013 and performed it at the Oriental Hotel in August 2013. She is of the opinion that policies that protect the creative industry should be implemented.

Career 
Her songwriting credits include:

 The Magic 2013 Christmas Theme Song
 In the Music Movie soundtrack
 All the songs in her EP, Santacruise
 Superwomen episode on Moments with Mo with Mo Abudu
 Urban Lounge TV show theme song

 Theatre  Oluronbi: The Musical 1 & 2: Sope (support). Aboriginal Productions.
 Oluronbi: The Musical 3: Ope (support). Aboriginal Productions
 Fractures: Toju (Lead). Aboriginal Productions
 Rubiewe: Cup (Support). Paws Productions.
 Saro: The Musical'': Ronke (Support). TerraKulture BAP Productions

Filmography 
Tinsel

Other ventures 
Tomi Odunsi is the CEO and founder of CGT Media Ltd, ⁣ an African entertainment and media company.

See also 

 List of Yoruba people
 List of Nigerian actresses

References 

Living people
1987 births
Nigerian film actresses
Yoruba actresses
21st-century Nigerian actresses
University of Lagos alumni
Nigerian television actresses
Nigerian women singers
Nigerian songwriters
Nigerian chief executives
Actresses in Yoruba cinema
Actresses from Ogun State